Xixi is a river in Tong'an District of Xiamen City, in Fujian Province of China.

The Xixi starts in the Zhaijianwei Mountains (寨尖尾山 Zhàijiānwěishān) in the northwestern part of Tong'an District, and flows in the general south-eastern direction. After receiving a number of tributaries - Lianhuaxi (莲花溪, Lotus Stream), Aoxi, Dingxi, it merges with the Dongxi (东溪, Eastern Stream) at the place called Shuangxikou (双溪口, "The confluence of two streams), near Tong'an District's central urban area. It then continues to the south, forming an estuary as it discharges into Dongzui Harbour, which is a bay of Taiwan Strait mostly enclosed by Tong'an District and  Xiang'an District on the mainland and the Xiamen Island.

References

Rivers of Fujian
Geography of Xiamen